Michael Wager (born Emanuel Weisgal, April 29, 1925December 26, 2011) was an American film and television actor.

Wager was born in New York, New York, and nicknamed "Mendy".  He was the son of Meyer W. and Shirley (Hirshfeld) Weisgal.

He appeared in the war film, Hill 24 Doesn't Answer, and he appeared in a recurring role, as Jonas Roving, on the soap opera Ryan's Hope. One of his roles was Thomas the Apostle in King of Kings. He also appeared in the soap opera Search for Tomorrow and made TV commercials.

Personal life
Wager's first marriage was to Mary Jo Van Ingen, December 21, 1948, (divorced, 1955); he later married Susan Blanchard, October 9, 1962, after her divorce from Henry Fonda (divorced, 1970). He had one daughter from his first marriage, and one son from his second marriage.

Filmography

References

External links

Michael Wager at the University of Wisconsin's Actors Studio audio collection

1925 births
2011 deaths
American male stage actors
American male film actors
American male soap opera actors
American male television actors
Place of birth missing
Male actors from New York City